JOAX-DTV (channel 4), branded as  (commonly known as ), is the flagship station of the Nippon News Network and the Nippon Television Network System, owned-and-operated by the  which is a subsidiary of the certified broadcasting holding company . It is listed subsidiary of The Yomiuri Shimbun Holdings, Japan's largest media conglomerate by revenue and the second largest behind Sony. Nippon Television Holdings forms part of Yomiuri's main television broadcasting arm alongside Kansai region flagship Yomiuri Telecasting Corporation, which owns a 6.4% share in the company. It is also the owner of Hulu Japan, formerly part of the US-based Hulu streaming service.

Nippon TV's studios are located in the Shiodome area of Minato, Tokyo, Japan and its transmitters are located in the Tokyo Skytree. It is also the first commercial TV station in Japan, and it has been broadcasting on Channel 4 since its inception. Nippon Television is the home of the syndication networks NNN (for news programs) and NNS (for non-news programs). Except for Okinawa Prefecture, these two networks cover the whole of Japan.

Branding
When Nippon TV started in 1953, its English acronym "NTV" was used as its first corporate logo, with a colored version later used in 1972 after the launch of color TV broadcasting. The logo was designed by Takada Masajiro, an assistant professor at Tokyo University of the Arts.In 2003, Nippon TV launched a new corporate logo with the introduction of Nandarou, the broadcaster's mascot. The orange dot in the 2003 logo represents the sun with the 日 in gold representing tradition. The logo was designed by Junichi Fumura, an employee of the broadcaster. On January 1, 2013, Nippon TV changed its logo as part of its 60th anniversary, with the "日" kanji changed to number 0 with a diagonal line inside, to denote starting from zero and starting anew. The change was inspired by the on-screen clock, usually located in the upper left corner of the screen.

Monsho logo and Nandarou mascot

In 1978, as part of its 25th anniversary, Nippon TV introduced a Monsho in addition to the corporate trademark.The logo was designed with the Nippon TV's "sun" and the earth represented by the Mercator projection, symbolizing NTV's leading position in the television industry.The logo is colored blue, representing clear skies. The Monsho was designed by Masahiro Touzawa, an employee of the broadcaster.

On August 28, 1992, as part of its 40th anniversary, Nippon TV invited Hayao Miyazaki to design its first mascot. The mascot was shaped like a mouse with the tail of a pig, symbolizing creativity, curiosity, and hard work. The mascot's name was collected from an audience nomination campaign and voted on from 51,026 names. The winning name of the mascot was "Nandarou", literally translating to "What is it?" The mascot was supposed to be used for one year only, but it was used until 2009 after audience popularity.

History

Early stages 
The history of Nippon TV began in 1951 with the announcement by US Senator Karl Mundt (best known as the key proponent of Voice of America) that commercial television will be set up in Japan (then under United States-led Allied Occupation of Japan). According to Canadian-Japanese writer Benjamin Fulford, Mundt recommended Matsutarō Shōriki to the CIA (which later hired Shōriki as a CIA agent under the codenames "podam" and "pojackpot-1"); with executives of  The Asahi Shimbun and Mainichi Shimbun, Shōriki then persuaded then-Prime Minister Shigeru Yoshida to form a commercial television network in Japan.

On July 31, 1952, Nippon TV was granted the first TV broadcasting license for a commercial broadcaster in Japan. The Nippon Television Network Corporation was established in October of the same year. After obtaining the broadcasting license, Nippon Television purchased the land for the construction of the headquarters building in Nibancho, Chiyoda-ku, Tokyo (currently the Nippon Television Kojimachi branch office), and began preparations for the broadcast of TV programs.However, due to delays in delivering equipment used for broadcasting, test trials were significantly delayed from their initial scheduled date, resulting in NHK being the first to start broadcasting TV programs.On August 24, 1953, Nippon TV started broadcast trials and four days later, Nippon TV officially began to broadcast TV programs as Asia's first commercial broadcaster, with an animated dove spreading its wings in the logo on its first sign-on. The first TV commercial (for Seikosha clocks) was also aired at the same time (reports say that the commercial aired upside-down by mistake).

Due to high prices, television sets were not widely available at the launch of NTV and NHK. As a result, NTV installed 55 street TVs in the Kanto area in an effort to broaden the advertisement impact. This program was a huge success, attracting 8,000 to 10,000 people to watch sports broadcasts such as professional baseball and sumo wrestling.

Plans for the expansion of Nippon TV to whole of Japan wasn't continued due to its given license being restricted to the Kanto area only.As a result, the Yomiuri Shimbun Group filed for a separate TV license in Osaka under the name Yomiuri TV. In 1955, Matsutaro Shoriki stepped down as the president of Nippon TV after being elected to the Japan's House Of Representatives. Said election was the first electoral coverage carried out by commercial TV in Japan.

Nippon News Network and launch of color TV 

With the issuance of a large number of new TV licenses by the Ministry of Posts in the late 1950s, Yomiuri Shimbun and Nippon Television began to establish TV stations outside the Kanto area. On August 28, 1958, Yomiuri TV started broadcasting, marking the start of Nippon TV's expansion into the Kansai area. However, due to the close partnership between Nippon TV and the Yomiuri Shimbun, the network's expansion was opposed by local newspapers, and the network's expansion was slower than that of the JNN affiliates, which are less newspaper-oriented. Before 1958, NTV's programming was seen on CBC and OTV, whose television broadcasts started on December 1, 1956. The four commercial television stations that existed at the time broadcast a special program called The Coming Year (which ran until the end of the Showa era). Until the last edition, production rotated between the main Kanto stations.

Precisely on the fifth anniversary of NTV's launch, Yomiuri TV and TV Nishinippon started broadcasting, and Nishinippon Broadcasting, who started earlier, created the backbones of a precursor of NNN. From December, when Tokai TV started broadcasting in the Tokai wide area, NTV programs moved to the new station.

Following TBS' establishment of JNN in 1959, Nippon Television founded the second Japanese television network, NNN, on April 1, 1966, with a total of 19 affiliated stations as founding members. Nippon Television founded the NNS (Nippon Television Network System) in 1972 to improve collaboration among network stations in the field of non-news programming. On September 15, 1959, Nippon Television's stock was listed on the Tokyo Stock Exchange, becoming the first media company in Japan to list its stock.

Nippon Television applied to the Ministry of Posts in April 1957 for a color television broadcast license, which it received in December of that year. Matsutaro Shoriki returned to Nippon TV as the president of the broadcaster after resigning as the Minister of State in 1958. After taking office as the president, he increased his investment in color television. In December 1958, NTV introduced videotape recording in a one-off drama series using American RCA 2-inch quad tape.

The first live coverage broadcast from Japan on color TV was the wedding of the Crown Prince (currently Emperor Emeritus Akihito) on April 10, 1959, alongside the first TV program with commercials broadcast in color. In December of the same year, NTV aired Japan's first color VTR broadcast Perry Como's Kraft Music Hall from NBC (United States). Nippon TV later obtained a broadcasting license for broadcasting programs in color on September 10, 1960. After a year, NTV aired a total of 938 hours of programs broadcast in color. In addition to color TV broadcast, programs produced in black and white color had been increasing.

In October 1963, Nippon TV has successfully trialed overnight broadcasts. On November 22, 1963, using a communication satellite relay, NTV conducted the first black-and-white TV transmission experiment between Japan and the United States during coverage of the Assassination of John F. Kennedy. On July 1, 1966, The Beatles’ concert at the Nippon Budokan, part of their Japanese tour, was shown in color on NTV (prerecorded on tape), with the viewing rate reaching 56 percent.

After the death of Matsutaro Shoriki on October 9, 1969, Nippon TV and NHK agreed to integrate signal transmission facilities in the Tokyo Tower.

1970s–1980s 

When Kobayashi Shoriki (son-in-law of Matsutaro Shoriki) took over Nippon TV in 1969, he continued the progress of TV broadcasting in color. In April 1970, Nippon TV's color programs accounted for 76.4% of total broadcast time, ahead of NHK which was second with 73%. In October 1971, Nippon TV achieved in broadcasting all of its programs in color.

However, during this period, due to the economic depression in Japan and the discovery of falsification of financial reports by the Ministry of Finance, Nippon TV was in the state of recession. Ratings of other Japanese commercial TV stations also declined during that period, from competing with Fuji TV for second place in the core bureau for most of the 1960s to competing with Fuji TV and NET TV (currently TV Asahi), and then being pulled away from TBS. This led Kobayashi Shoriki to launch business reforms to promote the outsourcing of program productions and decided to build a new headquarters which enabled them to turn losses into profits in 1972.

The non-news counterpart of Nippon News Network, Nippon Television Network System, was formed on June 14, 1972. Nippon TV had also been successful in exporting its programs around the world, with programs such as The Water Margin and Monkey being aired on the BBC. On January 14, 1973, NTV airs the live satellite relay in Japan for Elvis Presley's show in Hawaii, U.S.A. In October 8 & 15, 1975, the classic film Gone with the Wind makes its world television premiere on NTV (Part I on the 8th, Part II on the 15th), about 13 months before NBC airs the film in the North America.

Nippon TV also started diversifying its operations, opening subsidiaries such as Nippon TV Music, Union Movies, and Nippon Television Services in the early 70s.In the following years, Nippon TV also participated in cultural events such as the restoration of the Sistine Chapel ceiling in 1984which took 13 years to restore and costing to ¥2.4 billion and also held two special exhibitions at the Vatican Museums. On March 9, 1984, Dan Goodwin, aka Spider Dan, Skyscraperman, in a paid publicity event, used suction cups to climb the 10 floor Nippon Television Kojimachi Annex in Chiyoda.

On the 25th anniversary of Nippon TV's first broadcast, the broadcaster launched 24-hour TV: Love Saves the Earth, the only telethon in Japanese TV, which achieved high ratings and continued to be aired until the present day.But in the 1980s, ratings continue to decline after Fuji TV and TBS promoted much of their primetime programming.This prompted to increase airtime of its news programs and baseball events. Multichannel television sound broadcasting (using the EIAJ MTS standard) began in December 1982. Nippon TV also launched NCN (now known as Nippon TV NEWS 24) in 1987, being the first news channel in Japan.

1990s and "Triple Crown Ratings" 

Hayao Miyazaki of Studio Ghibli, Inc. designed Nippon Television's mascot character  to commemorate the channel's 40th anniversary in 1993.

After entering the 90s, although ratings of its Nippon TV affiliates increased, advertising revenue decreased in 1992 due to the collapse of Japan's bubble economy.The number of Nippon TV affiliates increased to 30 after Kagoshima Yomiuri Television started broadcasting in 1994. In 1992, after Seiichiro Ujiie (former journalist at the Yomiuri Shimbun) became president of Nippon TV, the broadcaster carried out major changes in its programming, such as adjusting its late night news programs to air early than its rivals, and ending certain primetime variety shows to boost ratings.These major changes helped become number 1 in ratings from 1993 to 1994 overtaking Fuji TV.As part of its major renovations in the broadcasting industry, Nippon TV launched its first cable-exclusive channel, CS Nippon TV, in 1996.

2000s 
At the start of the new century, Nippon TV and its 29 affiliates won in the triple crown ratings. In December 2000, Nippon TV launched its satellite-exclusive BS Nippon TV.On April 30, 2003, Nippon TV held a completion ceremony at its headquarters in Shiodome, Tokyo, which it took 7 years to build as part of its 50th anniversary from its opening. However, in October of the same year, employees of the network bribed the surveyed households to increase their ratings. This impacted the ratings of Nippon TV most especially on baseball games. Fuji TV took advantage of the incident when it became number 1 in ratings. Nippon TV started digital broadcasting on December 1, 2003. Nippon TV moved to Shiodome on February of the following year, and high definition production also started. With the rising trend for Internet services, Nippon TV launched Dai2 Nippon TV, the first video on-demand service from a commercial broadcaster in Japan.

Analog broadcasting ended on July 24, 2011, fully entering digital TV era. Also in 2011, Nippon TV regained the Triple Crown Ratings after 8 years due to high ratings of the drama I am Mita, Your Housekeeper. Although in 2012 and 2013, this was later taken by TV Asahi on ratings of its primetime programming. Nippon TV later regained the Triple Crown Rating in 2014. On April 26, 2012, Nippon Television Network Preparatory Corporation is founded as part of the network's major reorganization. On October 1, 2012,  Nippon Television Network Corporation (first) transitions to a certified broadcasting holding company, Nippon Television Holdings, Inc., and Nippon Television Network Preparatory Corporation is renamed Nippon Television Network Corporation (second).

On February 1–2, 2013, Nippon TV collaborated with NHK to air a special program related to the first TV broadcasts 60 years ago. On February 27, 2014, Nippon TV acquired the Japanese division of Hulu, Hulu Japan. They started airing more programs exclusively to Hulu following its acquisition, which was later criticized from viewers.

In 2015, Nippon TV (alongside the other 4 commercial broadcasters in Japan) launched TVer, its free on-demand service. On the Q4 of 2020, they started trials on live online streaming of its channel on TVer. In September 2020, Nippon TV, alongside PricewaterhouseCoopers, collaborated to create a system that uses artificial intelligence to predict audience ratings, which was first trialed on its movie block, Friday Roadshow. From Q4 of 2021, the broadcaster officially started its live online streaming of its channel, albeit with the exception of its late-night news program, news zero, and its succeeding program, despite being included in the trial the year before. Since 2021, Nippon TV currently holds the Triple Crown Rating for 11 years.

Coverage

Current

Broadcasting rights

Football

Soccer 
 FIFA
 FIFA Club World Cup

Basketball 
 FIBA
 FIBA Basketball World Cup

Rugby union 
 Rugby World Cup

Wrestling 
 World Wonder Ring Stardom

Motorsport 
 MotoGP

Multi-sport events 
 Summer Olympic Games
 Winter Olympic Games
 Asian Games

Former 
 FIFA World Cup (until 2018)

Technical Information

Network

After the launch of Japan News Network in April 1960, a new group of networks was supposed to be formed between Sendai Television, Nagoya TV, Nippon TV, and Hiroshima Telecasting in 1962.But in 1963, Nishinippon Shimbun, which is a key shareholder of Television Nishinippon, disagreed to Yomiuri Shimbun's plans to expand in Fukuoka Prefecture.This resulted in Television Nisihinippon withdrawing from being part of Nippon TV and losing Nippon TV's local news base in Kyushu. On April 1, 1966, Nippon News Network was formally launched with 19 founding members.

The non-news counterpart of Nippon News Network, Nippon Television Network System, was formed on June 14, 1972.

Offices
 The headquarters (Shiodome NTV Tower): 6–1, Higashi-Shimbashi Itchome, Minato, Tokyo, Japan
 Kojimachi Studio (the studios): Nibancho, Chiyoda, Tokyo (closed in 2019 for further redevelopments)
 Kansai Branch Office: Kintetsu Dojima Building, 2-2, Dojima Nichome, Kita-ku, Osaka, Osaka Prefecture

TV programs

News
 Zip! (morning news directed by Ami K)
 News Every (evening news)
 News Zero (late-night news)
 NNN News 24 (24-hour news channel)

Former Japanese dramas

2000s
 Ruri no Shima (瑠璃の島, 2005)
 Kikujirou to Saki 2 (菊次郎とさき 2, 2005)
 Joou no Kyoushitsu (女王の教室, 2005)
 Gokusen (ごくせん, 2002/2005/2008)
 Ai no Uta (あいのうた, 2005)
 Nobuta wo Produce (野ブタ。をプロデュース, 2005)
 Hana Yori Dango (花より男子, 2005)
 Kami wa Saikoro wo Furanai (神はサイコロを振らない, 2006)
 Kui-tan (喰いタン, 2006)
 Gyarusaa (ギャルサー, 2006)
 Primadem (プリマダム, 2006)
 CA to Oyobbi! (CAとお呼びっ!, 2006)
 My Boss My Hero (マイ☆ボス マイ☆ヒーロー, 2006)
 14-year-old Mother (14才の母, 2006)
 Tatta Hitotsu no Koi (たったひとつの恋, 2006)
 Enka no Joou (演歌の女王, 2007)
 Haken no Hinkaku (ハケンの品格, 2007)
 Kuitan 2 (喰いタン, 2007)
 Bambino! (バンビ～ノ!, 2007)
 Sexy Voice and Robo (セクシーボイスアンドロボ, 2007)
 Juken no Kamisama (受験の神様, 2007)
 Hotaru no Hikari (ホタルノヒカリ, 2007)
 Tantei Gakuen Q (探偵学園Q, 2007)
 Yukan Club (有閑倶楽部, 2007)
 Hataraki Man (働きマン, 2007)
 Dream Again (ドリーム☆アゲイン, 2007)
 Binbou Danshi (貧乏男子 ボンビーメン, 2007)
 Saitou-san (斉藤さん, 2008)
 1 Pound no Fukuin (1ポンドの福音, One Pound Gospel, 2008)
 Osen (おせん, 2008)
 Hokaben (ホカベン, 2008)
 Gakkō ja Oshierarenai! (学校じゃ教えられない！, 2008)
 Seigi no Mikata (正義の味方, 2008)
 Yasuko to Kenji (ヤスコとケンジ, 2008)
 Oh! My Girl (オー！マイ・ガール！！, 2008)
 OL Nippon (ＯＬにっぽん, 2008)
 Scrap Teacher (スクラップ･ティーチャー, 2008)
 Kami no Shizuku (神の雫, 2009)
 RESET (リセット, 2009)
 Zeni Geba (銭ゲバ, 2009)
 Moso Shimai (妄想姉妹, 2009)
 Kiina (キイナ, 2009)
 Aishiteiru (アイシテル, 2009)
 The Quiz Show (ザ・クイズショウ, 2009)
 Samurai High School (サムライ・ハイスクール, 2009)

2010s
 Mother (2010)
 Kinoshita Bucho to Boku ((木下部長とボク), 2010)
 Magerarenai Onna (曲げられない女, 2010)
 Misaki NO.1!! (美咲ナンバーワン!!, 2011)
 Deka Wanko (デカワンコ, 2011)
 Sayonara Bokutachi no Youchien (さよならぼくたちのようちえん, 2011)
 Kono Sekai no Katasumi ni (この世界の片隅に, 2011)
 Kaseifu no Mita (家政婦のミタ, 2011) – the highest watched show of 2011 in Japan
 Himitsu Chouhouin Erika (秘密諜報員_エリカ, 2011)
 Deka Kurokawa Suzuki (デカ_黒川鈴木, 2012)
 Dirty Mama! (ダーティ・ママ!, 2012)
 Konna no Idol Janain!? (こんなのアイドルじゃナイン!?, 2012)
 Perfect Son (理想の息子, 2012)
 Sūgaku Joshi Gakuen (数学女子学園, 2012)
 Teen Court: 10-dai Saiban (ティーンコート, 2012)
 Cleopatra na Onnatachi (クレオパトラな女たち, 2012)
 Shiritsu Bakaleya Koukou (私立バカレア高校, 2012)
 Taburakashi (たぶらかし, 2012)
 Ghost Mama Sousasen (ゴーストママ捜査線, 2012)
 Sprout (スプラウト, 2012)
 Totkan Tokubetsu Kokuzei Choshukan (トッカン_特別国税徴収官, 2012)
 Vision: Koroshi Ga Mieru Onna (VISION_殺しが見える女, 2012)
 Akumu-chan (悪夢ちゃん, 2012)
 Sugarless (シュガーレス, 2012)
 Tokyo Zenryoku Shoujo (東京全力少女, 2012)
 Muse no Kagami (2012)
 Share House no Koibito (シェアハウスの恋人, 2013)
 35-sai no Koukousei (35歳の高校生, 2013)
 Hakuba no Ōji-sama (ハクバノ王子サマ, 2013)
 Gakkō no Kaidan (学校のカイダン, 2015)
 Marumaru Tsuma (○○妻), 2015) 
 Majisuka Gakuen4 (マジすか学園4, 2015)
 Jimi ni Sugoi! Kōetsu Girl: Kouno Etsuko (2016)
 Kyabasuka Gakuen (2016)
 Ieuru Onna (家売るオンナ, Your Home Is My Business!, 2016)
 Kaettekita Ieuru Onna (帰ってきた家売るオンナ, Your Home Is My Business! Returns, 2017)
 Omae wa Mada Gunma o Shiranai (2017)
 Voice: 110 Emergency Control Room (2019)
 Ieuru Onna no Gyakushū (家売るオンナの逆襲, Your Home Is My Business!: 2nd Attack, 2019)
 Innocence, Fight Against False Charges (2019)
 Nurse in Action!! (2019)

Variety
 Question for one hundred million people!? Waratte Koraete! (1億人の大質問!?笑ってコラえて!)
 Guruguru Ninety Nine (Gurunai, ぐるぐるナインティナイン, ぐるナイ)
 Sekaiichi Uketai Jugyo (世界一受けたい授業)
 Enta no Kamisama ~the god of Entertainment~ (エンタの神様 ~the god of Entertainment~)
 Sekai Marumie! TV Tokusoubu (世界まる見え!テレビ特捜部)
 The! Tetsuwan! DASH!! (ザ!鉄腕!DASH!!)
 Gyoretsu no dekiru Horitsu Sodanjo (行列の出来る法律相談所)
 Shōten (笑点;the second longest running TV show in Japan, continuously broadcast since May 1966).
 Gaki no tsukai (DownTown's Gaki no Tsukai ya Arahende!!, ガキの使いやあらへんで!!)
 Arashi no Shukudai-kun (嵐の宿題くん)
 Cartoon KAT-TUN (カートゥンKAT-TUN, Kātūn Katūn?)
 AKBingo!
 Kyosen to Maetake no Geba Geba 90 pun (Gyosen x Maetake's Geba Geba 90 minutes 巨泉×前武ゲバゲバ90分！)
 Karikyura Mashin (Curriculumachine カリキュラマシーン)
 Music Lovers
 God of Music (音楽の神様）

Former
 Family Wisdom of the Itos (伊東家の食卓)
 Nazo o toke! Masaka no Mistery (謎を解け!まさかのミステリー)
 Magical Zunou Power!! (マジカル頭脳パワー!!) (1990s)
 Tokujo! Tensei Shingo (特上!天声慎吾)
 Dotch Cooking Show (どっちの料理ショー, Yomiuri Telecastiong Corp.)

Movie industry
 20th Century Fox
 New Line Cinema
 Columbia Pictures
 Lionsgate
 Universal Pictures
 Warner Bros.

Animation

The company has intimate connections with Studio Ghibli, led by Hayao Miyazaki. Nippon TV has funded all of the company's productions since Kiki's Delivery Service (excluding Earwig and the Witch, which was fully funded by rival NHK) and holds the exclusive Japanese rights to broadcast their motion pictures. It has also produced and broadcast popular anime series like My Hero Academia, Claymore, Death Note, Hajime no Ippo,Magical Emi The Magic Star, Orange Road, as well as Detective Conan and Inuyasha (which are produced through its Osaka affiliate, Yomiuri TV). NTV produced the first, unsuccessful Doraemon anime in 1973; when the second, more successful Doraemon series premiered in 1979, it was on TV Asahi, which remains the franchise's broadcaster to this day. As of now, NTV is currently producing a second anime adaptation of Hunter × Hunter. NTV has also been broadcasting the yearly Lupin III TV specials since 1989, which they co-produce with TMS Entertainment. Nippon Television announced on February 8, 2011, that it would make the anime studio Madhouse its subsidiary after becoming the primary stockholder at about 85%, via a third-party allocation of shares for about 1 billion yen (about US$12 million).

On January 29, 2014, Nippon Television announced that it will purchase a 54.3% stake in Tatsunoko Production and adopt the studio as a subsidiary.

Special TV programs
 Kin-chan and Shingo Katori's All Japan Costume Grand Prix (欽ちゃん&香取慎吾の全日本仮装大賞)
 24 Hour Television, Love Saves the Earth (24時間テレビ「愛は地球を救う」, annual telethon on the TV stations of NNS)
 Trans America Ultra Quiz (アメリカ横断ウルトラクイズ)
 All Japan High School Quiz Championship (全国高等学校クイズ選手権)
 Nippon Television Music Festival (日本テレビ音楽祭)

Notable person
Matsutarō Shōriki (Founder)

List of most-watched films 
The following is a list of the most-watched films of all time on NTV, .

See also
 Television in Japan
 Japanese media
 Hato no kyūjitsu (Dove's Day Off), NTV's station identification

Notes

References

External links
  - 
  - 
 Nittele G+ Official Site - 
 News Zero
 News Every
 Nittele News 24
 
 Collection of Nippon Television's Idents, Hato no Kyojitsu

 
1952 establishments in Japan
Anime companies
Companies listed on the Tokyo Stock Exchange
Television networks in Japan
Japanese-language television stations
Mass media companies based in Tokyo
Nippon News Network
Television channels and stations established in 1953
Television in Tokyo
Television stations in Japan
Hulu Japan
Minato, Tokyo